Falsonyctopais lamottei is a species of beetle in the family Cerambycidae, and the only species in the genus Falsonyctopais. It was described by Lepesme in 1949.

References

Tragocephalini
Beetles described in 1949